Ravindra Palleguruge (born 6 April 1985) is a Sri Lankan cricketer. He made his first-class debut for Singha Sports Club in the 2005–06 Premier Trophy on 14 January 2006.

References

External links
 

1985 births
Living people
Sri Lankan cricketers
Singha Sports Club cricketers
Sri Lanka Army Sports Club cricketers
Sportspeople from Galle